Farr is a parish in the county of Sutherland in the Scottish council area of Highland. The parish also includes a small hamlet named Farr.

Parish of Farr

Villages and hamlets
Villages and hamlets within the parish of Farr include:

Achiemore
Achina
Altnaharra
Armadale
Aultiphurst
Balnacraig
Bettyhill
Farr (the hamlet)
Lednagullin
Melvich
Strathnaver
Swordly
Upper Bighouse

References

Populated places in Sutherland
Civil parishes of Scotland
Farr, Sutherland